The Antipodean albatross (Diomedea antipodensis) is a large seabird in the albatross family. Antipodean albatrosses are smaller than wandering albatrosses, and breed in predominantly brown plumage, but are otherwise difficult to distinguish from young wanderers (wandering albatrosses grow lighter in color with age, while the Antipodean stays darker).

Etymology
Diomedea antipodensis breaks into Diomedea referring to Diomedes, whose companions turned to birds, and antipodensis, the Latin form of the Antipodes Islands, where they are found.

Taxonomy
The Antipodean albatross belongs to the order Procellariiformes. Like all members of this order, they have naricorns, tubular nasal passages on their bill. They also have a unique palate with seven to nine bony plates. One of the great albatrosses of the genus Diomedea, it was only distinguished as a subspecies of the wandering albatross in 1992 and recognised by some authorities as a full species in 1998. While not all scientists believe it is a full species, retaining it with the wandering albatross, a 2004 study of the mitochondrial DNA and microsatellites of the wandering albatross species complex supported the split. Among the major experts, BirdLife International has split this species, Jim Clements has not yet, and the SACC has a proposal on the table to split it.

Subspecies
There are two sub-species; however there was a study in 1998 that suggested splitting this species, though this was not accepted in a 2004 study.
 Diomedea antipodensis antipodensis, nominate race, breeds on the Antipodes Islands and Campbell Island
 Diomedea antipodensis gibsoni, breeds on the Auckland Islands

Description
Its breeding plumage is brown and white and its juveniles are similar in appearance to the wandering albatross. Breeding females have brown upper parts, and have white vermiculations on their back. Its face, throat, lower breast, and belly are white, and its undertail coverts are brown. Its underwings are also white, but with a dark tip. Breeding males are whiter than females, but not as white as the wandering albatross, and both sexes have a pink bill. The females of the nominate race have a dark brown breast band and the males have a darker cap, tail, and humeral flexure than gibsoni.

Range and habitat

At sea Antipodean albatrosses range across the South Pacific from Australia to as far as Chile, from the Tropic of Capricorn south. The gibsonii seems to range to the east of Auckland Island, and the nominate race ranges to the east to Chile. They breed on the Auckland Islands, Antipodes Islands, and Campbell Island.

Behaviour
They feed predominantly on cephalopod and to a lesser extent fish (unlike other albatross species they are not recorded eating any crustaceans), and have been recorded visiting the spawning grounds of the giant cuttlefish off New South Wales. They nest on ridges, slopes, or plateaus, and will build their nest in the open or within patchy vegetation, such as tussock grassland.

Conservation
A 2007 population estimate numbered between 4,635 and 5,757 breeding pairs on Antipodes Island, 5,800 pairs on the Auckland Islands (Adams Island, Auckland Island, and Disappointment Island), and 10 pair on Campbell Island. There has been 1 pair breeding on Pitt Island, Chatham Islands since 2004. This places the total population at 25,300. Both breeding success (25%) and adult survival rates (80% female & 88% male) have been declining.

Pigs and feral cats are hurting the population on Auckland Island and longline fishing is still impacting them. Recent studies have shown that a rise in Tasman Sea temperature may be impacting gibsoni.

Banding has been an ongoing process, and will continue with satellite tracking of the species. Cattle and sheep have been eradicated from Campbell Island, and all the islands are nature preserves and recently became World Heritage Sites. Cats and pigs need to be removed from the Auckland Islands, the fisheries need to be worked with and the ocean temperature fluctuations need to be studied to help this species survive.

Footnotes

References

External links

Species factsheet - BirdLife International
Holotype photos -  Museum of New Zealand Te Papa Tongarewa

Antipodean albatross
Birds of the Antipodes Islands
Birds of the Campbell Islands
Birds of the Auckland Islands
Antipodean albatross